Badla Jatti Da  is a 1991 Punjabi film. This films stars Gugu Gill and Yograj Singh.

Story
Pregnant Gulabo (Sunita Dheer) is devastated when her entire family is slaughtered by Jaildar Jung Singh (Yograj Singh) and his goons, when the latter finds out that her brother-in-law, Jasbinder (Palvinder Dhami), had dared to woo his daughter, Bebo. Gulabo swears to avenge this humiliation by forcing a marriage between her son and Jung's daughter.

She spends the rest of her life training her son Jagga (Gugu Gill) to overcome Jung and his goons. She soon realizes that her son will have to face-off Jung Singh, his goons, his three sons and gun-toting daughter Laali (Upasana Singh) (who would rather kill Jagga than wed him), as well as Choudhary Joravar Singh and his son, Shamsher, who wants to wed Laali at any cost.

Star cast

Cast

Gugu Gill - Jagga
Yograj Singh -	Jaildaar Jung Singh
Upasna Singh -	Laali Kaur
Sunita Dhir -	Gulabo Kaur
Upasana Sinhj  - Laali
Surinder Shinda - Shinda
Amar Noorie  - Noorie
Kulbir Baderson - Tejo Kaur
Palvinder Dhami - Jasbinder
Surendra Sharma - Tunda
Yash Sharma - Choudhary Joravar Singh
Surjit Bindrakhia - live performance
Sharan Deep - Shamsher

References

Punjabi-language Indian films
1990s Punjabi-language films
1991 films
1991 action films
Indian action films